Robert Edwin Talton (born June 27, 1945) is an American politician. He served as a Republican member for the 144th district of the Texas House of Representatives.

Life and career
Born in Pasadena, Texas, Talton attended Pasadena High School. He went on to the University of Houston, where he earned his bachelor's degree, and the South Texas College of Law Houston, where he earned a Juris Doctor degree.

In 1993, was elected to represebt the 144th district of the Texas House of Representatives. In 2009, Talton was succeeded by Ken Legler.

Talton was a candidate for the 22nd district of Texas of the United States House of Representatives, but lost the election. He has also been a candidate to serve as the chief justice of the Supreme Court of Texas, running against Nathan Hecht.

References 

1945 births
Living people
People from Pasadena, Texas
Pasadena High School (Pasadena, Texas) alumni
Republican Party members of the Texas House of Representatives
20th-century American politicians
21st-century American politicians
University of Houston alumni
South Texas College of Law alumni